The 2012–13 Army Black Knights men's basketball team represented United States Military Academy during the 2012–13 NCAA Division I men's basketball season. The Black Knights, led by fourth year head coach Zach Spiker, played their home games at Christl Arena and were members of the Patriot League. They finished the season 16–15, 8–6 in Patriot League play to finish in fourth place. They advanced to the semifinals of the Patriot League tournament where they lost to Bucknell.

Roster

Schedule

|-
!colspan=9| Regular season

|-
!colspan=9| 2013 Patriot League men's basketball tournament

References

Army Black Knights men's basketball seasons
Army
Army Black Knights men's basketball
Army Black Knights men's basketball